Martha Madison (born Martha Anne Butterworth; July 27, 1977) is an American actress best known for her portrayal of Belle Black on the NBC soap opera Days of Our Lives.

Early life 
Madison was born in Newport News, Virginia. She was raised in Houston, Texas, attended Cypress Creek High School, and graduated from Texas A&M University in 1999 with a degree in psychology. She was also the Captain of the Texas A&M Dance Team. In 1999, she moved to New York City to attend the American Musical and Dramatic Academy.  She danced with the Peyari Dance Project for two years.  However, after several injuries, she was forced to retire from dance.

Television career
Madison had a small role in the film Kate & Leopold in 2001. She moved to Los Angeles in 2003 to pursue a career in film/television, and briefly appeared on the NBC soap opera Passions in 2004. Madison next played the role of Belle Black on the NBC soap opera Days of Our Lives from 2004 to 2008. During this time in 2007, she appeared on The Tyra Banks Show to help model/host Tyra Banks  through "soap opera school."

In 2008, Madison appeared in the Without a Trace episode "Rewind", and in the Criminal Minds episode "The Big Wheel" in 2009. From 2010 to 2014, Madison appeared on the soap opera web series The Bay as Marly Nelson-Foster. In June 2011, Madison temporarily took over the role as Elizabeth Webber on General Hospital, appearing from June 8–20, 2011. She and General Hospital Lilly Melgar currently co-host TradioV.com's SoapBox with Lilly and Martha, which airs live every Thursday at 2pm pacific on tradiov.com. In 2015, Madison began starring as Miranda Winterthorne in the soap opera web series Winterthorne. Later in 2015, Madison returned to her role as Belle Black on Days of Our Lives

Other pursuits
Starting in 2005, Madison was named an ambassador for the National Multiple Sclerosis Foundation and helped re-design their website. Her mother has been living with multiple sclerosis for nearly 25 years.

In July 2009, Madison and her husband A.J. Gilbert opened a gastro sports pub in Studio City called Henry's Hat (which they named after their Weimeraner, Henry). Together, Madison and Gilbert also own Luna Park in Hollywood and Luna Park in San Francisco. The couple sold Henry's Hat in August 2012, and sold Luna Park Los Angeles in March 2013.

In October 2012, Madison and Gilbert launched the first, free, web-based restaurant inventory management system called ChefSheet, available on iTunes.

Personal life 
Madison announced on her official forum, that she had become engaged to her boyfriend, restaurateur A.J. Gilbert, the owner of Luna Park in San Francisco, Los Angeles and New York, on July 29, 2006, when he took her to the Hotel Del Coronado in San Diego for her birthday. Madison and Gilbert married on August 25, 2007.

In April 2013, Madison announced that she was pregnant with her first child. On November 3, 2013, she gave birth to her daughter Charley Elizabeth Gilbert.

Filmography

Awards and nominations

References

External links

1977 births
Living people
Texas A&M University alumni
American soap opera actresses
People from Newport News, Virginia
21st-century American women